Surabaya BIN Samator is a men's volleyball team based in Surabaya, East Java, Indonesia. The team is owmed by Samator Indo Gas and affiliated with Indonesian State Intelligence Agency since 2022. The team plays in Indonesian men's Proliga. They had represented Indonesia in AVC Club Championships in 2009, 2012, and 2016.

Honours
Proliga
 Champions (6): 2004, 2007, 2009, 2014, 2016, 2018, 2019
 Runners-up (4): 2002, 2003, 2006, 2010, 2022
Livoli Premier Division
Champions (8): 2000, 2001, 2009, 2010, 2011, 2014, 2017, 2018
Runners-up (3): 2015, 2016, 2019

References

Indonesian volleyball clubs
Volleyball clubs established in 2002
2002 establishments in Indonesia